Musicalische Ergötzung (English: Musical Delight, PWC 370a–375, T. 331–336, PC 348–353) is a collection of chamber music by Johann Pachelbel. Published during his lifetime, it contains six suites for two violins and basso continuo.

The exact circumstances of the German-titled work's publication are unknown. The only extant copy of the original print was published in or after 1699 in Nuremberg, by Johann Christoph Weigel, a publisher who also issued several other works by Pachelbel. Yet Johann Mattheson, writing some decades after Pachelbel's death, claimed that Musicalische Ergötzung was first published in 1691.

The collection contains six parties, or suites:
 Partie I in F major: Sonata (Allegro) – Allemande – Courante – Ballet – Sarabande – Gigue
 Partie II in C minor: Sonata – Gavotte – Trezza – Aria – Sarabande – Gigue
 Partie III in E major: Sonata (Allegro) – Allemande – Courante – Gavotte – Sarabande – Gigue
 Partie IV in E minor: Sonata (Adagio) – Aria – Courante – Aria – Chaconne
 Partie V in C major: Sonata – Aria – Trezza – Chaconne
 Partie VI in B major: Sonata (Adagio) – Aria – Courante – Gavotte – Sarabande – Gigue

These are not the exact titles in the original published edition but "normalized" into a more modern international terminology. For example, in the original German edition, "Chaconne" was spelled "Ciacona", "Gigue" as "Gigg", "Courante" as "Courant", etc.

The technique of scordatura (alternative tuning used for the open strings) is applied to the violin parts of all suites, but, unlike contemporary composers such as Heinrich Ignaz Biber, Pachelbel used it sparingly, not to produce special effects but to teach the amateur performers (for whom the work was probably intended) the basics of this technique.

References
 Kathryn Jane Welter. Johann Pachelbel: Organist, Teacher, Composer. A Critical Reexamination of His Life, Works, and Historical Significance, pp. 173–209. Harvard University, Cambridge, Massachusetts, 1998 (dissertation).
 

1691 compositions
Compositions by Johann Pachelbel